638 Moira, also known as A907 JG, is a minor planet orbiting the Sun. First observed in 1906, 638 Moira was discovered to be an orbital body in 1907 by Joel Hastings Metcalf in Taunton, England. 638 Moira is a little over 59.5 km across and rotates once every 10 hours. Its farthest point from the sun is a little over 3au during its 4.5 year orbit, and it is classed as an L-type asteroid (SMASSII).

References

External links
 
 

Background asteroids
Moira
Moira
Ch-type asteroids (SMASS)
19070505